Deathstalker, also known as El cazador de la muerte, is a 1983 sword and sorcery film directed by James Sbardellati (credited as John Watson), and starring Rick Hill, Barbi Benton, Bernard Erhard and Lana Clarkson.

An international co-production of Argentina and the United States, it was the first in a series of four films about the Deathstalker character and his adventures, and the first of ten films that Roger Corman produced in Argentina during the 1980s.

Plot
The warrior Deathstalker is sent by a witch on a quest to find a chalice, an amulet, and a sword, two of which are held by the wicked sorcerer Munkar (Bernard Erhard). Deathstalker finds the sword almost immediately, which has been hidden by the witch in a cave guarded by an ogre and an imp. The imp Salmaron reveals himself to be a thief cursed by the witch and aids Deathstalker in defeating the ogre. Deathstalker removes the curse from Salmaron and the thief agrees to accompany Deathstalker on his journey. Sword in hand, Deathstalker sets out to Munkar's castle to gain the remaining objects of power.

On his journey, Deathstalker learns of a tournament from Oghris (Richard Brooker), a charming warrior. Munkar has invited warriors across the land to participate in contests until a winner is determined - the winner will inherit Munkar's kingdom. One night along the way to the tournament, the pair meet Kaira, a defiant female warrior (Lana Clarkson) who wears only a G-string and a cloak.  Later that night Deathstalker has sex with her. Salmaron looks on with amusement at the pair.  Kaira joins the group on their journey the next morning.

Arriving at Munkar's castle, Deathstalker and the other participants gather in Munkar's banquet room the night before the tournament. The warriors are invited to get drunk and rape Munkar's harem slaves, including Princess Codille (Barbi Benton). Oghris connects with one slave girl while Kaira keeps Deathstalker to herself. Deathstalker rescues Princess Codille, briefly, but Munkar takes her back. Munkar reveals to his assistant that his true agenda is for the warriors to fight each other to the death until only a weakened survivor remains for Munkar to kill. This would remove all threats to his rule. Munkar transforms his assistant into the likeness of the Princess and sends him to kill the hero; when Deathstalker attempts to rape Codille, he discovers that the woman is not all "woman" and sends her away. Kaira finds the assassin; assuming she is the real Codille, she is tragically killed by the assassin in a sword fight after Munkar's disguise spell wears off.

The night after the first day of the tournament, Oghris is taken by Munkar's men to a prison cell while Salmaron is attacked by prison guards. The thief is knocked into a well that leads to Munkar's harem. It is revealed that Oghris brought Deathstalker to the tournament expressly for Munkar and he is ordered to kill him. Reluctant to kill his friend, Oghris warns Deathstalker and asks the hero to just leave the tournament but Deathstalker refuses and attacks him. During the brawl, Oghris has the chance to draw the sword and kill Deathstalker but chooses to fight fairly and ultimately loses. Deathstalker says goodbye to the fighter and kills him.

The last day of the tournament arrives and there are only two competitors left - Deathstalker and an ogre. After a long fight, Deathstalker kills the ogre and moves to claim his prize. He is attacked by Munkar's men but makes his way to the amulet. Salmaron is discovered in the harem room but frees the women and helps them slay the guards. Deathstalker defeats the holder of the amulet and faces Munkar; he is able to defeat the sorcerer's illusions and claims the third object of power. Deathstalker declares he has no interest in Munkar's power or kingdom - he destroys the three objects of power and throws Munkar to a crowd of slaves who tear him apart.

Cast

Production
The film was shot on location and at Aries Studios in Buenos Aires.

Reception

Box office
Deathstalker was a modest hit at the box office, coming in 61st for the year, and its success was mostly due to its release at a time when Conan the Barbarian was creating a market for sword and sorcery films while also having a tight budget.

The film was also popular on home video, becoming a staple during the fledgling days of cable television and video rentals.

Critical response
The Boston Globe called it "a cauldron brimming with stale filmmaking, stone-faced acting and primitive editing. Aside from the nasty rapes (I lost count after six) and the endless violence, "Deathstalker" drips with derivative dullness...the movie is so bad that the director can't even give you a credible decapitation".

The Los Angeles Times noted that the film was "funny on purpose" and "pleasantly silly", while also praising its "brisk direction".

Sequels
The film's commercial success encouraged Roger Corman and Argentinian producer-director Hector Olivera to collaborate again to produce Barbarian Queen, with Lana Clarkson in the title role.

Three sequels were released: Deathstalker II, Deathstalker and the Warriors from Hell, and Deathstalker IV: Match of Titans.

Legacy
The film launched the career of Lana Clarkson, who became a recognizable cult celebrity in the genre. Clarkson later worked with Roger Corman on Barbarian Queen and Barbarian Queen II: The Empress Strikes Back, and guest starred in an episode of Black Scorpion.

Corman went on to make nine more films in Argentina:
The Warrior and the Sorceress (1984)
Wizards of the Lost Kingdom (1985)
Barbarian Queen (1985)
Cocaine Wars (1985)
Amazons (1986)
Deathstalker II (1987)
Stormquest (1987)
Two to Tango (1988)
Play Murder for Me (1990)

References

External links
 
 
 Deathstalker B-Movie Review
 Review at Trash Film Guru
 Review at Psycho Drive In

Deathstalker (film series)
1983 films
1980s fantasy adventure films
American fantasy adventure films
American sword and sorcery films
English-language Argentine films
Films about rape
Films about witchcraft
Films about wizards
Films set in castles
Argentine fantasy adventure films
1980s English-language films
Films shot in Buenos Aires
1980s American films